Vahirua is a surname. Notable people with the surname include:

Marama Vahirua (born 1980), Tahitian footballer
Pascal Vahirua (born 1966), French footballer

Surnames of Oceanian origin